Ubbergen is village and former municipality in the eastern Netherlands, in the province of Gelderland. The village is part of the municipality of Berg en Dal (formerly known as Groesbeek).

Notable people
Notable people who were born in Ubbergen include:
 Don Burgers (1932–2006), politician for the KVP and the CDA
 Amber (1970), Dutch-German singer, songwriter and music producer
 Yelmer Buurman (1987), professional racing driver

Gallery

References

External links
 

Municipalities of the Netherlands disestablished in 2015
Former municipalities of Gelderland
Populated places in Gelderland
Geography of Berg en Dal (municipality)